James Rizzi (October 5, 1950 – December 25, 2011) was an American pop artist who was born and raised in Brooklyn, New York.

Biography
Rizzi graduated from University of Florida in Gainesville, Florida. He came up with the idea of 3D multiples now mostly associated with his name when, having taken classes in painting, printmaking and sculpturing, he had to hand in grade work for all three subjects, but only had time for doing one. So he created an etching, printed it twice, handcolored it, and mounted parts of the one print on top of the other, using wire as a means of adding depth. Having received good grades from all three teachers, he stuck with the idea and developed it further.

Rizzi was most famous for his 3D artwork, "especially the large, elaborate prints and teeming anthropomorphic cityscapes. His merry maximalism and delight in delirious detail and elaborate minutiae created a true art brand, a trademark style as recognizable as any in the world."

Late in life, he returned to painting. His "latest paintings combine his Picasso meets Hanna-Barbera drawing style with an increasingly chromatic palette and a complex graphic structure that simultaneously evokes cubism and the most sophisticated Amerindian friezes."

Timeline

Gallery

Books 
 James Rizzi: New York. Prestel 1996, 
 James Rizzi, Peter Bührer: Mein New York Kochbuch. Hahn 1997, 
 James Rizzi, Peter Bührer: American Cookies and more. Südwest 2000, 
 James Rizzi, Glenn O`Brien: James Rizzi. Artwork 1993-2006, Art28 2006,

References

External links

 
 Official website
 James J. Rizzi Scholarship Fund - The James J. Rizzi Scholarship Fund for the School of Art at the University of Florida.
 RTL Spendenmarathon - Design of logo for German television children's charity.
 SWR Herzenssache - Donation of artwork for German radio children's charity.
 James Rizzi Private Gallery NYC - Early close personal friend of James Rizzi, Art Dealer
 "James Rizzi Art" (One of the largest collections of James Rizzi artworks)
 Gone with the wind Charity - Donation of a complete edition of artwork to the German Lions Club Krefeld Rheintor.
 Peter Maffay: Encounters - an alliance for children - Cooperation with Peter Maffay for his children's charity "Encounters" and the Lakota  Circle School in South Dakota.

1950 births
2011 deaths
University of Florida alumni
20th-century American painters
20th-century American male artists
American male painters
21st-century American painters
21st-century American male artists
Artists from New York (state)
American pop artists
American stamp designers
People from Brooklyn
American people of Italian descent